Hilson Phillip (20 December 1940 – 1986) was an Antiguan cricketer. He played in thirteen first-class matches for the Leeward Islands from 1964 to 1970.

See also
 List of Leeward Islands first-class cricketers

References

External links
 

1940 births
1986 deaths
Antigua and Barbuda cricketers
Leeward Islands cricketers